Delta Caeli (δ Caeli) is a solitary, blue-white hued star in the southern constellation of Caelum. It is a dim star but visible to the naked eye, having an apparent visual magnitude of +5.06. Based upon an annual parallax shift of 4.63 mas as seen from Earth, this star is located roughly 700 light years from the Sun.  At that distance, the visual magnitude is diminished by an extinction factor of 0.13 due to interstellar dust.

This is a B-type star with a stellar classification of B2 IV-V, where the luminosity class IV-V indicates the spectrum shows mixed traits of a subgiant star and a main sequence star. It has 7−8 times the mass of the Sun and about 3.9 times the Sun's radius. The star is around nine million years old and is radiating 2,578 times the Sun's luminosity from its photosphere at an effective temperature of 21,150 K.

References

External links
 HR 1443
 Image Delta Caeli

B-type main-sequence stars
B-type subgiants
Caeli, Delta
Caelum
Durchmusterung objects
028873
021060
1443